The 1993 National Rowing Championships was the 22nd edition of the National Championships, held from 16–18 July 1993 at the Strathclyde Country Park in Motherwell, North Lanarkshire.

Senior

Medal summary

Lightweight

Medal summary

Under-23

Medal summary

Junior

Medal summary

Coastal

Medal summary 

Key

References 

British Rowing Championships
British Rowing Championships
British Rowing Championships